Thermal Integrity Profiling is a non-destructive testing method of evaluating the integrity of concrete foundations. It is standardized by ASTM D7949 - Standard Test Methods for Thermal Integrity Profiling of Concrete Deep Foundations.

The testing method was first developed at the University of South Florida. It relates the heat generated by curing of cement to the integrity and quality of drilled shafts, augered cast in place (ACIP) piles and other concrete foundations. In general, a shortage of competent concrete (necks or inclusions) is registered by relative cool regions; the presence of extra concrete (over-pour bulging into soft soil strata) is registered by relative warm regions.

Cement temperatures are either sampled throughout the concrete hydration process  or a test is conducted at a time prior to the peak curing temperature having been reached. Either way, measurements are available relatively soon after pouring (6 to 72 hours), typically earlier than when other integrity testing methods such as cross hole sonic logging and low strain integrity testing can be performed.

Temperatures are measured along the entire depth of the foundation. If records at a certain depth show regions with cooler temperatures (when compared to the average temperature at that depth), a concrete deficiency or defect may be present. An average temperature at a certain depth that is significantly lower than the average temperatures at other depths may also be indication of a potential problem. It is also possible to estimate the effective area of the foundation, and to assess if the reinforcing cage is properly aligned and centered.

References

Cement
Concrete
Corrosion